Mszanka may refer to the following places:
Mszanka, Lesser Poland Voivodeship (south Poland)
Mszanka, Lublin Voivodeship (east Poland)
Mszanka, West Pomeranian Voivodeship (north-west Poland)